Tomazinho Cardozo (born 14 April 1946), is an Indian politician, dramatist, playwright, writer (in Konkani and English) and educationist from Goa. He is a former Speaker of the Goa Legislative Assembly. He is known for his achievements on the literary front and the popular tiatr stage in Goa.

Career

Teaching and politics

Cardozo was in teaching for much of his life, having taught maths and science at the school level. He was the sarpanch of Candolim village panchayat for 22 years from 1977. In 1995 he was elected to the Goa Legislative Assembly from the Calangute constituency, which he served for five years. He made his debut on the Konkani tiatr stage in 1957, and "wrote a play practically every year for the tiatr performance of the church feast".

Konkani plays

Among his popular Konkani plays are Kanttech Kantte (1980, whose title could be translated to Thorns, And Yet More Thorns). He founded the tiatr group Tiatr Mogi (Lovers of Tiatr), has been part of the formation of Kala Mogi (Lovers of Art) is also one of the founders of Kandolechim Kirnam, a prominent folk troupe which participated and won numerous awards including the prestigious mando festival award 11 times in the All Goa Mando festivals organized by Goa Cultural and Social Centre from 1974.

TAG mentor

He is considered to be a mentor of writers in Roman-script Konkani and has been active in groups like the Dalgado Konknni Akademi and the Tiatr Academy of Goa. Cardozo was appointed president of the Tiatr Academy of Goa in February 2011. He has won awards as the best sarpanch (1983), for teaching (2003), and literature (2009).

References

External links
Interview with Goenche.com
Tomazinho Cardozo is appointed Tiatr Academy president
Showman Speaker, in OutlookIndia.com
Goa assembly adjourned to Tuesday, Rane gets reprieve for now
Profile on FindallGoa
Meet the Writer: Tomazinho Cardozo
Tomazinho Cardozo, DKA Silver Jubilee, recording by Joel DS
Tomazinho Cardozo, an interview in Mangalore
Tomazinho Cardozo, former Editor, Amcho Avaz, recorded by Joel DS
Dr. Wilfred A. De Souza & Others vs Shri Tomazinho Cardozo Hon'Ble ... on 7 September, 1998
Tomazinho Cardozo to release 5 volumes of his tiatr scripts

1946 births
Dramatists and playwrights from Goa
Living people
Speakers of the Goa Legislative Assembly
Indian National Congress politicians from Goa
Goa MLAs 1994–1999